The Western Public Service Building is a historic building in Scottsbluff, Nebraska. It was built in 1931 by Ernest Leafgreen for the Western Public Service Company, an electricity company whose president was  E. C. Van Diest. It was designed in the Art Deco style by architect Everett L. Goldsmith, with "terra cotta sheathing of the two public facades, the west and the north." It has been listed on the National Register of Historic Places since October 15, 2004.

References

National Register of Historic Places in Scotts Bluff County, Nebraska
Art Deco architecture in Nebraska
Buildings and structures completed in 1931